Bleecker Street is an east–west street in the New York City borough of Manhattan. It is most famous today as a Greenwich Village nightclub district. The street connects a neighborhood today popular for music venues and comedy, but which was once a major center for American bohemia. The street is named after the family name of Anthony Lispenard Bleecker, a banker, the father of Anthony Bleecker, a 19th-century writer, through whose family farm the street ran.

Bleecker Street connects Abingdon Square (the intersection of Eighth Avenue and Hudson Street in the West Village) to the Bowery and East Village.

History

Bleecker Street is named by and after the Bleecker family because the street ran through the family's farm. In 1808, Anthony Lispenard Bleecker and his wife deeded to the city a major portion of the land on which Bleecker Street sits.

Originally Bleecker Street extended from Bowery to Broadway, along the north side of the Bleecker farm, later as far west as Sixth Avenue. In 1829 it was joined with Herring Street, extending Bleecker Street northwest to Abingdon Square.

LeRoy Place

LeRoy Place is the former name of a block of Bleecker Street between Mercer and Greene Streets. This was where the first palatial "winged residences" were built. The effect was accomplished by making the central houses taller and closer to the street, while the other houses on the side were set back. The central buildings also had bigger, raised entrances and lantern-like roof projections. The houses were built by Isaac A. Pearson, on both sides of Bleecker Street. To set his project apart from the rest of the area, Pearson convinced the city to rename this block of the street after the prominent international trader Jacob LeRoy.

Transportation
The  serve the Christopher Street – Sheridan Square station one block north of Bleecker Street.

Traffic on the street is one-way, going southeast. In early December 2007, a bicycle lane was marked on the street.

Notable places

Landmarks
 Bayard–Condict Building
 Bleecker Sitting Area contains a sculpture by Chaim Gross and won a Village Award.
 Bleecker Street Cinema, closed in 1991
 Lynn Redgrave Theater, formerly known as Bleecker Street Theater
 The Little Red Schoolhouse, one of the nation's first progressive schools, on the corner of 6th Avenue and Bleecker Street.
 Our Lady of Pompeii Church, Carmine Street
 Overthrow, a boxing club, is located at 9 Bleecker Street, in the former home of the Youth International Party (Yippie)
 Mills House No. 1  at 160 Bleecker Street was planned to be designated as an official landmark by the New York City Landmarks Preservation Commission in 1967, but the owner's lawyer objected.
 The Silver Towers at 100 Bleecker Street are home to New York University faculty housing
 Washington Square Park

In addition, there are several Federal architecture-style row houses at 7 to 13 and 21 to 25 Bleecker Street on easternmost block of Bleecker Street, in NoHo between Lafayette Street and the Bowery. 21 and 29 Bleecker Street were also once the home of the National Florence Crittenton Mission, providing a home for "fallen women". 21 Bleecker Street's entrance now bears the lettering "Florence Night Mission", described by The New York Times in 1883 as "a row of houses of the lowest character". The National Florence Crittenton Mission was an organization established in 1883 by Charles N. Crittenton. It attempted to reform prostitutes and unwed pregnant women through the creation of establishments where they were to live and learn skills.

The building at 58 Bleecker Street (formerly 64 Bleecker Street) was built in 1823 for James Roosevelt, great-grandfather of president Franklin Delano Roosevelt. It was there that Elizabeth Blackwell, America's first female doctor, established a clinic with her sister Emily.

Across the street from the former home of the National Florence Crittenton Mission is both the headquarters of Planned Parenthood, and the Catholic Sheen Center, immediately adjacent to it. Bleecker Street now features the Margaret Sanger Square, at the intersection with Mott Street. Bleecker Street was the original home of Sanger's Birth Control Clinical Research Bureau, operated from another building from 1930 to 1973. The street features in the 2020 drama film Never Rarely Sometimes Always, written and directed by Eliza Hittman.

Night spots
 The Bitter End at 147 Bleecker Street
 Cafe Au Go Go was in the basement of the New Andy Warhol Garrick Theatre (in the 1960s) at 152 Bleecker Street
 (Le) Poisson Rouge at 158 Bleecker Street
 The Village Gate was at 160 Bleecker Street

Restaurants
 John's of Bleecker Street, famous pizzeria established in 1929
 Kesté, highly rated Neapolitan-style pizzeria established in 2009
 Quartino Bottega Organica, or "Quartino" for short, at 11 Bleecker Street

Former
 The CBGB club, which closed in 2006, was located at the east end of Bleecker Street, on Bowery
 Bleecker Bob's record shop started at 149 Bleecker street

Notable residents
 James Agee lived at 172 Bleecker Street, above Cafe Espanol (1941–1951)
 John Belushi lived at 376 Bleecker Street (1975)
 Mykel Board
 Peter Cunningham (photographer)
 Robert De Niro grew up on Bleecker Street
 Robert Frank lived at 7 Bleecker Street
 Glen Hansard lived at 21 Bleecker Street
 Mariska Hargitay
 Lorraine Hansberry (1953-1960)
 Alicia Keys
 Dua Lipa (2019-2020)
 Herman Melville lived at 33 Bleecker Street as a boy.
 Cookie Mueller lived at 285 Bleecker Street, above Ottomanelli's (1976–1989)
 Jeweler and Sculptor Jill Platner lives and works at 58 Bleecker
 Craig Rodwell lived at 350 Bleecker Street (1968–1993), from which he organized New York's first gay pride parade.
 James Roosevelt at 58 Bleecker Street
 Edward Thebaud
 Mark Van Doren
 Gernot Wagner
 Dave Winer

In popular culture

Literature
 Valenti Angelo's 1949 novel The Bells of Bleecker Street is set in the Italian American community in that neighborhood.
 Nobel laureate Derek Walcott wrote a poem about Bleecker Street entitled "Bleecker Street, Summer".
 In Marvel Comics, 177A Bleecker Street is the location of Doctor Strange's Sanctum Sanctorum.
 "The Repairer of Reputations"—the first short story in Robert W. Chambers 1895 collection The King in Yellow—includes a storyline featuring an armourer on Bleecker Street.

Film and television
 The Kate & Allie television show from the 1980s depicted two single mothers living on Bleecker in a basement apartment.
In the original Teenage Mutant Ninja Turtles movie from 1990, the corner of 11th and Bleecker is where April O'Neil lives and runs her father's old antique store known as The Second Time Around.
 Much of the film No Reservations (2007), starring Catherine Zeta-Jones and Aaron Eckhart, is set in a restaurant on the corner of Bleecker and Charles Streets. The name of their fictitious restaurant is 22 Bleecker.
 In The WB series What I Like About You, Holly and Valerie live in an apartment on Bleecker Street.
 The Matthews family in Girl Meets World live near Bleecker Street and frequent the Bleecker subway station.
 New Andy Warhol Garrick Theatre (in the 1960s) at 152 Bleecker Street.
 Akin to the comics, the New York Sanctum is located on 177A Bleecker Street in the Marvel Cinematic Universe (MCU). It appeared in the films Doctor Strange (2016), Thor: Ragnarok (2017), Avengers: Infinity War (2018), Avengers: Endgame (2019), Spider-Man: No Way Home (2021), and Doctor Strange in the Multiverse of Madness (2022); as well as the Disney+ series Loki (2021).
 In the 2002 film Gangs of New York, there is a scene where a man mentions Bleecker Street whilst singing the sea shanty New York Girls.
 Bleecker Street, a film distribution company, is named after the street.

Music
 Gian-Carlo Menotti wrote an opera The Saint of Bleecker Street
 Japanese pop star Ayumi Hamasaki visited Bleecker Street during recording of her (Miss)understood album. The pictures were later published in Hamasaki's famous "Deji Deji Diary" that is published in each issue of ViVi Magazine.
 Iggy Pop discusses dying on Bleecker Street in his song "Punk Rocker".
 The Simon & Garfunkel album Wednesday Morning, 3 A.M. contains a song called "Bleecker Street".
 "Growing Old on Bleecker Street" is a song featured on the debut album, Living Room, of pop trio AJR.
 "Downtown Bleecker" is a modern instrumental jazz piece for saxophone which appears on the digital EP Midnight Sun, produced by independent artist Simon Edward.
 "Country Boy and Bleecker Street” is a song which appears on the 1967 album “H.P. Lovecraft”, by the folk-rock band H.P. Lovecraft.
 Fred Neil has mentioned Bleecker Street in multiple works in his carrier, most notably in two of his album covers.
Peter Paul and Mary mentioned Bleecker Street in their song "Freight Train" on the album In the Wind
Joni Mitchell mentioned Bleecker Street in her song "Tin Angel" on her 1969 album Clouds, and later in "Song for Sharon" on the album Hejira.
Lloyd Cole mentioned Bleecker Street in his song "What Do You Know About Love?" on his 1990 album Lloyd Cole
 "77 Bleeker Street" is a song by Jill Jones, written, composed and produced by Prince. It was a b-side to the single Mia Bocca from the album Jill Jones.
 Paolo Nutini mentioned Bleecker Street in his song "Better Man" on his 2014 album Caustic Love.

Other 

 A bar named “Bleecker Street Lounge” is open in the Disneyland Paris' Hotel New York — The Art of Marvel since its themed reopening of 21 June 2021.
There is a character from Dimension 20's The Unsleeping City, The Great Dragon of Bleecker Street, that is named after this street.

References

External links

 Forgotten New York
 New York Songlines: Bleecker Street
 Downtown Bleecker : Instrumental Jazz

East Village, Manhattan
Entertainment districts in New York (state)
Greenwich Village
Streets in Manhattan
West Village
Bleecker family